Morris Gest (also Maurice Guest, March 15, 1875 – May 16, 1942) was an American theatrical producer of the early 20th century.

Early life
Moishe Gershnowitz was born near Vilna (then part of the Russian empire, now Lithuania), the son of Leon and Elizabeth Gershonovitz. Through his mother he was a member of the middle-class Michliszanski clan which included his cousin, later renamed as Bernard Berenson, the art historian.

A couple were emigrating to Boston and agreed to take him with them in 1890. Later, he attracted the attention of Mr. Thompson, for whom he worked in the library of the United States District Court who saw to it that he went to school.

Career
The theatre was the first job that came Gest's way and he gained experience in most of the skills involved in Boston's theatres. In 1901, he went to New York and worked for Oscar Hammerstein at the Manhattan Opera House and was promoted to foreign representative. He also produced Broadway shows such as Morris Gest's "Midnight Whirl" (1919) with music by George Gershwin and lyrics by Buddy DeSylva.

After some false starts in production by himself, he teamed up with F. Ray Comstock and in the 1920s made his reputation by the import of Russian productions from the post-Revolutionary regime. In 1922 and 1923, Gest and Comstock presented Nikita Balieff's company "La Chauve-Souris". They also presented the Moscow Art Theatre directed by Konstantin Stanislavski which reigned over New York drama despite the handicap of Russian dialogue. In 1923, he organised the last U.S. tour of Eleanor Duse.

In 1924, he brought Max Reinhardt from Germany to stage The Miracle to which Gest brought his own talents in publicity and casting. These were well needed as the heavy costs of the sets, costumes, and cast of 175 could have meant financial disaster.

In 1929, he put on Broadway, a presentation of “The Passion Play”.

Later life
The Great Depression and the parting from Comstock seem to have curbed his productions for five years but there was a last production, Lady Precious Stream in 1936. The same year marked the onset of a nervous breakdown. However he recovered sufficiently to be involved in the "Morris Gest's Little Miracle Town: with the world's greatest midget artistes". This was in connection with the 1939 New York World's Fair.

All the participants were midgets that Gest had brought from Germany, and the entire project was seen as a tawdry freak show, a sad commentary on the life of the producer who, in the 1920s, had introduced America to European high art.

He died on May 16, 1942. His widow, Reina, the daughter of David Belasco, died in 1948.

References

Further reading

Interview with Morris Gest, The American Hebrew, 29 December 1922
Charles B. Cochran, Secrets of a Showman, William Heinemann Ltd, 1925 p. 178, 179, 249, 266, 375, 417
Vladimir Nemirovitch-Dantchenko, My Life in the Russian Theatre, Geoffrey Bles, London, 1937 p. 277, 281
Stanley Appelbaum, The New York Stage-Famous Productions in Photographs ("The Miracle") Dover Publications, New York, 1976, p. 66
Lady Diana Cooper, Autobiography (Michael Russell, London 1979), p. 233, 240, 245, 250, 252, 257, 260, 275, 279, 286, 288, 289, 313
Philip Ziegler, Diana Cooper: The Biography of Lady Diana Cooper, Alfred A. Knopf, New York (1982) p. 129, 130, 132, 139, 140, 142, 146
George Freedley and John Reeves, A History of the Theatre, Crown Publishers, New York 1941, p. 334.
William Weaver,Duse- A Biography, Thames and Hudson, London, 1984, p. 349,350-8
Gottfried Reinhardt, The Genius: A Memoir of Max Reinhardt, Alfred A. Knopf, New York, p. 38, 40-41, 57, 162, 170, 248, 291
Letter from US Passport Office, 8 June 1964 on emigration date and change of name

External links
 
 Morris Gest Collection at the Harry Ransom Center

Morris Gest, "Winning Farrar". Photoplay, July 1915, pp 115–117. Here in archive.org. About Geraldine Farrar: "How the most famous prima-donna in the world was secured for the photoplays. The man who turned the trick tells the story."

1875 births
1942 deaths
American theatre managers and producers
American people of Russian-Jewish descent
Emigrants from the Russian Empire to the United States